JU-ON: Origins (Japanese 呪怨：呪いの家; "ju-on" literally means "resentment") is a Japanese horror streaming television series based on the Ju-On franchise. The series premiered on Netflix on July 3, 2020.

Cast and characters 
 Yoshiyoshi Arakawa as Yasuo Odajima
 Ouka Katou as Yasuo Odajima (5 years old)
 Yuina Kuroshima as Haruka Honjo
 Seiko Iwaido as the Woman in White
 Koki Osamura as Yudai Katsuragi/Katsuji Kobayashi
 Ririka as Kiyomi Kawai/Kumi Shigematsu
 Nana Owada as Yoshie Minakami
 Hitomi Hazuki as Mai Hyodo
 Kaho Tsuchimura as Manami Kuze
 Kana Kurashina as Kimie Ariyasu
 Harmeet Obhrai as Abdallah
 Atsuki Yamada as Toshiki Shigematsu 
 Kai Inowaki as Tetsuya Fukazawa
 Takemi Fujii as Yuka Tsujii
 Izumi Matsuoka as Mina Kawai
 Tomomitsu Adachi as Takumi Noguchi 
 Nobuko Sendo as Michiko Fukazawa 
 Ryota Matsushima as Keiichi Masaki 
 Shinsuke Kato as Nobuhiko Haida 
 Nana Yanagisawa as Keiko Haida 
 Ryushin Tei as Tamotsu Kosaka 
 Jui Nogimoto as Kazuha Odajima 
 Shiyun Nakamura as Atsushi Sasaki 
 Tokio Emoto as M
 Haruka Kubo as Chie Masaki 
 Yuya Matsuura as Kokichi Odajima 
 Noriaki Kamata as Noriyasu Sako 
 Remi Niinai as Natsuki Ito 
 Atom Shukugawa as Yusaku Morozumi 
 Yura Anno as Tomoko Morozumi 
 Yoshiki Urayama as Hiroshi Sunada 
 Mihiro as Assistant to TV Show Host

Episodes

References

External links
 
 
Press material on Netflix Media Center

2020 Japanese television series debuts
Japanese horror fiction television series
Japanese-language Netflix original programming
Japanese-language television shows
Ju-On
Live action television shows based on films
NBCUniversal Entertainment Japan
Television shows set in Japan